Martur is a mandal panchayat in  Bapatla district of the Indian state of Andhra Pradesh. It is the mandal headquarters of Martur mandal in chirala revenue division. As of 2011 Census of India, Martur had a population of 21,434 with average literacy rate of 67.48 %. Martur is famous for granite polishing industries and Vegetable market.

Geography 
It has an average elevation of 30 meters (101 feet).

Assembly constituency

Martur was an assembly constituency in Andhra Pradesh since 1952 to 2004 except few years in between. The Assembly constituency was abolished in the year 2009 due to delimitation of Assembly and parliamentary constituencies.

References 

Villages in Prakasam district
Mandal headquarters in Prakasam district